The 1994 Los Angeles Rams season was the franchise's 57th season in the National Football League, their 58th overall, and their 49th and final in the Greater Los Angeles Area until their 2016 relocation back to Los Angeles. After nearly 50 years in the Greater Los Angeles Area, including 15 seasons at Anaheim Stadium, owner Georgia Frontiere announced that the team would relocate to St. Louis, Missouri on January 15, 1995. While the owners initially rejected the move, permission was eventually granted therefore bringing an end to Southern California's first major professional sports franchise until 2016.

The threat of relocation dominated talk about the Rams from early in the offseason right up to the moment the move was announced and it had a major effect on the franchise's standing in the market. Average attendance for Rams games at Anaheim Stadium was at an all-time low (an average of 43,312 a game) as ownership negotiated with both Baltimore and St. Louis. Leigh Steinberg organized a group known as “Save the Rams” and attempted to reach out to ownership and strike a deal to keep the team in the Southern California market, however, their efforts proved to be unsuccessful.

On the field, the Rams continued their downward spiral and missed the postseason for the fifth consecutive season. Los Angeles only won four games and clinched their fifth losing season in a row on December 4 against the New Orleans Saints and finished the season on a seven-game losing streak. The Rams defense saw some glimmers of hope, shutting out Joe Montana’s Chiefs and putting together solid performances against Arizona and New York, but it was not nearly enough to lift the Rams back to the .500 mark. At the end of the season, head coach Chuck Knox was fired after three consecutive last place finishes in the NFC West and Frontiere also relieved John Shaw of his General Manager duties, although he remained with the team as a high-ranking executive.

Offseason

1994 Draft Class

Undrafted free agents

Personnel

Team Roster

Staff

Preseason

Schedule

Regular season

Schedule

Game Summaries

Week 1

Week 2

Week 3

Week 4

Week 5

Week 6

Week 7

Week 8

Week 10

Week 11
The final meeting between the two Southern California rivals ended in a close 20–17 victory for the Raiders in Anaheim. The Los Angeles Rams and the Los Angeles Raiders only met five times as cross-town rivals with the Rams finishing with a 1–4 record against the Raiders. The games, however, were generally very close with only one of the meetings being decided by more than one score (the Raiders' 16–6 victory in 1985). The 1994 meeting was a back and forth affair that eventually saw the Raiders ice the game away with a pair of field goals in the fourth quarter.

Week 12
This was the last meeting between the Rams and 49ers as California rivals until 2016 and it ended with the eventual Super Bowl champion 49ers on top with a 31–27 final. While the meeting between the two rivals in Anaheim was not very close, the 1994 meeting at Candlestick Park was a very close affair to close out the Los Angeles-San Francisco rivalry. The 49ers jumped out to an early 14–3 lead and held a 21–6 lead at halftime, the Rams, however, came storming back in the second half, outscoring San Francisco 21–10. Los Angeles was able to take the lead in the fourth quarter on a 22-yard pass play by Chris Miller, but the 49ers responded with a touchdown drive of their own to take a 31–27 advantage. The 49ers ended up holding on for their ninth win of the season while the Rams dropped their seventh game en route to a 4–12 season. The final record between the Los Angeles Rams and the San Francisco 49ers from the 1950 to 1994 was 48–40 in favor of Los Angeles.

Week 13
Week thirteen saw the final meeting between the Los Angeles Rams and the San Diego Chargers. The Rams jumped out to a 14–6 lead in the first half, but Los Angeles was unable to hold off the eventual AFC Champion Chargers and fell 31–17. After the season, the Chargers ended up having the entire Southern California megaregion to themselves after the Rams and the Raiders vacated the Los Angeles market—an arrangement that would not be changed until 2016, when the Rams relocated to Los Angeles. Los Angeles was also mathematically eliminated from the NFC West race during week 13 after its loss to San Diego and with San Francisco improving to 8–2 on the next day on Monday Night Football.

Week 14

Week 15
In front of a sparse crowd of around 34,000 at Tampa Stadium, Los Angeles dropped its fifth game in a row and in the process became mathematically eliminated from playoff contention for the fifth consecutive season. The game was fairly evenly matched (both were 4–9 going into the game) except for a 17-point outburst in the second quarter by the Buccaneers that gave Tampa Bay the victory.

Week 16

Week 17
In front of the smallest crowd at Anaheim Stadium, the Rams closed out their tenure in Southern California with a loss to the 2–13 Washington Redskins. After a season full of rumors of the franchise’s inevitable relocation, the fan base had withered down to next to nothing and two high school football games at Anaheim Stadium drew larger crowds than the announced attendance for the Rams’ week 17 game. Many fans spent the game chanting expletives and hurling insults and owner Georgia Frontiere and the City of St. Louis—“Save the Rams” founder Leigh Steinberg attempted to discuss keeping the Rams in Southern California, but Rams executives were nowhere to be found. The game was a close affair with the hapless Washington Redskins and despite being favored by 3.5 points, Los Angeles ended up falling by three points to end 49 seasons of Los Angeles Ram football. They would subsequently return to Los Angeles in 2016 after experiencing similar issues in St. Louis as they previously did in Los Angeles.

Standings

Relocation to St. Louis
By 1994, the Los Angeles Rams had withered to a mere shadow of their former self. Accusations and excuses were constantly thrown back and forth between the Rams’ fan base, ownership, and local politicians. Many in the fan base blamed the ownership of Georgia Frontiere for the franchise’s woes, while ownership cited the outdated stadium and withering fan support for the problems that were plaguing the Rams. On March 15, 1994, the National Football League owners rejected Ms. Frontiere’s bid to move the franchise to St. Louis, Missouri, her native city, by a 21–3–6 vote, with the Raiders abstaining. Then-Commissioner Paul Tagliabue stated after rejecting the move that The commissioner also added:

Frontiere, however, responded with a thinly veiled threat at a lawsuit and the NFL owners eventually acquiesced to her demands, weary of going through a long, protracted legal battle. Tagliabue simply stated that “The desire to have peace and not be at war was a big factor” in allowing the Rams move to go forward. In a matter of a month, the vote had gone from 21–6 opposed to 23–6 in favor, with the Raiders again abstaining. Jonathan Kraft, son of Patriots owner Robert Kraft, elaborated on the commissioners remarks by saying “About five or six owners didn’t want to get the other owners into litigation, so they switched their votes.” Only six teams remained in opposition to the Rams move from Los Angeles: the Pittsburgh Steelers, New York Giants, New York Jets, Buffalo Bills, Arizona Cardinals (who played in St. Louis from 1960–87), and Washington Redskins. After the vote was over, Dan Rooney publicly stated that he opposed the move of the Los Angeles Rams because

See also
History of the Los Angeles Rams
Anaheim Stadium

References

External links
 1994 Los Angeles Rams at Pro-Football-Reference.com

Los Angeles Rams
Los Angeles Rams seasons
Los Ang